The 1971 Temple Owls football team was an American football team that represented Temple University as an independent during the 1971 NCAA University Division football season. In its second season under head coach Wayne Hardin, the team compiled a 6–2–1 record and outscored opponents by a total of 248 to 136. The team played its home games at Temple Stadium in Philadelphia. 

The team's statistical leaders included Doug Shobert with 1,513 passing yards, Paul Loughran with 468 rushing yards and 48 points scored, and Randy Grossman with 473 receiving yards, and Henry Hynoski with 60 points scored.

Schedule

References

Temple
Temple Owls football seasons
Temple Owls football